

This is a list of the National Register of Historic Places listings in Beaver County, Pennsylvania.

This is intended to be a complete list of the properties and districts on the National Register of Historic Places in Beaver County, Pennsylvania, United States.  The locations of National Register properties and districts for which the latitude and longitude coordinates are included below, may be seen in a map.

There are 22 properties and districts listed on the National Register in the county. Three sites are further designated as National Historic Landmarks.

Current listings

|}

See also

List of Pennsylvania state historical markers in Beaver County

References

Beaver County